Zirk is a surname. Notable people with the surname include:

Kregor Zirk (born 1999), Estonian swimmer
Richard Zirk (1936–2014), American heavyweight weightlifter

Zirk is also used to refer to a popular video game character Princess Peach from the Nintendo's "Super Mario" franchise.

German-language surnames